The CNA C.VI I.R.C.43 was a six-cylinder, supercharged, inverted, inline engine designed and built in Italy in the 1930s.  Following standard Italian practice, the designation IRC43 indicated that the engine was inverted, geared down and had a supercharger rated to 4,300 m (14,110 ft).

Applications
Data from Italian Civil and Military Aircraft 1930-1945
 CNA Eta
 CNA 15
 CNA 25

Specifications

References

CNA C.VI
CNA aircraft engines